Jungle Fever is a 1991 American romantic drama film written, produced and directed by Spike Lee. The film stars Lee, Wesley Snipes, Annabella Sciorra, Ossie Davis, Ruby Dee, Samuel L. Jackson, Lonette McKee, John Turturro, Frank Vincent, Halle Berry (in her film debut), Tim Robbins, Brad Dourif, Queen Latifah, Michael Imperioli, and Anthony Quinn, and is Lee's fifth feature-length film. Jungle Fever explores the beginning and end of an extramarital interracial relationship against the urban backdrop of the streets of New York City in the early 1990s. The film received positive reviews, with particular praise for Samuel L. Jackson's performance.

Plot
Successful Harlem architect Flipper Purify lives with his wife Drew, a buyer at Bloomingdales, and their young daughter, Ming. At work, Flipper discovers that an Italian-American woman named Angie Tucci has been hired as his temp secretary. Initially upset at being the only black person, he relents after being told hiring is based on ability, not race.

Angie lives in Bensonhurst with her abusive father Mike and her brothers Charlie and Jimmy. Angie's quiet fiancé Paulie runs a corner grocery store and lives with his elderly widowed father Lou. Meanwhile, Angie feels suffocated at home.

After working several late nights together, Flipper and Angie have sex, beginning a tumultuous relationship. The next day, Flipper demands his superiors, Jerry and Leslie, promote him to partner, but he is denied. He resigns, having plans to start his own firm.

Eventually, Flipper admits his infidelity to his longtime friend, Cyrus, who criticizes him not for his infidelity towards his wife, but for his affair with a white woman. Cyrus refers to his situation as "jungle fever"—an attraction borne of sexualized racial myths rather than love—and Flipper asks Cyrus not to tell anyone. Angie's friends are equally disparaging when she tells them she is having a relationship with a black man.

Drew learns about Flipper's affair through Cyrus' wife Vera and throws him out of their home. Flipper moves in with his father, Southern Baptist preacher The Good Reverend Purify and mother, Lucinda Purify. Later, Mike severely beats Angie after discovering that she is dating a black man and kicks her out of their home.

At Drew's workplace, Flipper attempts to reconcile but Drew kicks him out, feeling he was only attracted to her for being half-white, and that Flipper was searching for a white woman as he was a successful black man. Flipper and Angie move into an apartment in Greenwich Village where they encounter discrimination for being a mixed-race couple, such as being insulted by a waitress named LaShawn, chastisement from The Good Reverend, and financial issues.

After some play fighting, Flipper gets restrained by two policemen (the same ones who killed Radio Raheem two years prior) who receive a call that he was attacking Angie. The couple's issues are compounded by Flipper's feelings for his family and Angie wanting to have children of her own, causing their split. Echoing what Cyrus told him earlier, Flipper tells Angie their relationship has been based on sexual racial myths and not love. Angie, although upset, accepts that the relationship has run it's course. 

Later, Flipper's crack-addicted brother Gator steals and sells Lucinda's TV for crack. Searching all over Harlem, Flipper eventually finds him in a crack house and exasperatedly disowns him.

Soon after, Gator returns to his parents' house to ask for money and, after Lucinda refuses, begins ransacking the home. His erratic behavior ignites an altercation that ends with The Good Reverend proclaiming angrily that his son is "evil and better off dead" before shooting him. Gator collapses and dies in Lucinda's arms as The Good Reverend watches remorsefully.

Meanwhile, Paulie's racist Italian-American friends mock him for having lost his girlfriend to a black man. He asks one of his customers, a friendly black woman named Orin Goode, out on a date. This angers his father, whom he defiantly ignores. En route to meet Orin, Paulie is assaulted viciously by his other customers for attempting an interracial relationship. Although badly beaten, Paulie still arrives for his date with Orin.

Mike reluctantly allows Angie to return home, and Flipper unsuccessfully tries to mend his relationship with Drew. As Flipper leaves from his apartment, a young crack-addicted prostitute propositions him, and in response, Flipper throws his arms around her and cries out in anguished torment.

Cast

Themes

Racism 
Lee dedicated the film to Yusuf Hawkins. Hawkins was killed on August 23, 1989, in Bensonhurst, New York by Italian-Americans who said the teenager was involved with a white girl in the neighborhood, though he was actually in the neighborhood to inquire about a used car for sale. According to the New York Daily News, "the attack had more to do with race than romance".

Drugs 
In the film, Flipper's brother, Gator, is a crack addict. He is constantly pestering his family members for money. His father has disowned him, but his mother and Flipper still occasionally give him money when he asks.

In an interview with Esquire, Jackson explains that he was able to effectively play the crack addict Gator because he had just gotten out of rehab for his own crack addiction. Because of his personal experience with the drug, Jackson was able to help Lee make Gator's character seem more realistic by helping establish Gator's antics and visibility in the film.

Music
The film's soundtrack was by Stevie Wonder and was released by Motown Records. Although the album was created for the movie, it was released before the movie's premiere in May 1991. It has 11 tracks, all of which are written by Stevie Wonder, except for one. Though some believe that Wonder's album was unappealing, others believed that it was his best work in years.

The instrumental theme for the film is "Bless the Star" by Terence Blanchard. This theme was used in Mo Better Blues previously but does not appear on either's soundtrack.

Reception

Critical response
The film garnered mostly positive reviews from critics, with particular praise for Samuel L. Jackson's performance as crack addict Gator, which is often considered to be his breakout role. On Rotten Tomatoes, the film has an approval rating of 80% based on reviews from 49 critics. The site's consensus states: "Jungle Fever finds Spike Lee tackling timely sociopolitical themes in typically provocative style, even if the result is sometimes ambitious to a fault." On Metacritic, the film has a score of 78% based on reviews from 24 critics, indicating "generally favorable reviews".

Roger Ebert of the Chicago Sun-Times gave it three-and-a-half out of four stars and wrote: "Jungle Fever contains two sequences - the girl talk and the crackhouse visit - of amazing power. It contains humor and insight and canny psychology, strong performances, and the fearless discussion of things both races would rather not face."

Accolades
 1991 Cannes Film Festival
 Best Supporting Actor: Samuel L. Jackson
 Prize of the Ecumenical Jury (Special Mention)
 Kansas City Film Critics Circle Awards
 Best Supporting Actor: Samuel L. Jackson
 National Board of Review
 10th Best Film of the Year
 New York Film Critics Circle Awards
 Best Supporting Actor: Samuel L. Jackson
 Political Film Society Human Rights Award

Year-end lists
The film is recognized by American Film Institute in these lists:
 2002: AFI's 100 Years...100 Passions – Nominated

References

External links
 
 
 
 
 

1991 films
1991 romantic drama films
1990s American films
1990s English-language films
40 Acres and a Mule Filmworks films
African-American romantic drama films
African-American films
American romantic drama films
Filicide in fiction
Films about adultery in the United States
Films about drugs
Films about dysfunctional families
Films about interracial romance
Films about Italian-American culture
Films about prostitution in the United States
Films about racism in the United States
Films directed by Spike Lee
Films produced by Spike Lee
Films scored by Terence Blanchard
Films set in Brooklyn
Films set in Harlem
Films with screenplays by Spike Lee
Murder in films
Universal Pictures films